New Hampshire Route 84 is a  secondary east–west state highway in Rockingham County in southeastern New Hampshire.  The western terminus is in Kensington at New Hampshire Route 150.  The eastern terminus of NH 84 is in Hampton Falls at U.S. Route 1.

Route description
NH 84 begins at an intersection with NH 150 in Kensington.  After less than a mile, it crosses into Hampton Falls, heading eastward towards downtown.  NH 84 crosses over Interstate 95 without an interchange (access via NH 101 or NH 107) and turns north, ending at US 1 just feet from the eastern terminus of NH 88.

NH 84 is known as Kensington Road in Hampton Falls and Lamprey Road in Kensington.

Junction list

References

External links
 New Hampshire State Route 84 on Flickr

084
Transportation in Rockingham County, New Hampshire